Events from the year 1948 in Ireland.

Incumbents
 President: Seán T. O'Kelly
 Taoiseach:
 Éamon de Valera (FF) (until 18 February 1948)
 John A. Costello (FG) (from 18 February 1948)
 Tánaiste: 
 Seán Lemass (FF) (until 18 February 1948)
 William Norton (Lab)  (from 18 February 1948)
 Minister for Finance: 
 Frank Aiken (FF) (until 18 February 1948)
 Patrick McGilligan (FG) (from 18 February 1948)
 Chief Justice: Conor Maguire
 Dáil: 
 12th (until 12 January 1948)
 13th (from 18 February 1948)
 Seanad: 
 5th (until 12 March 1948)
 6th (from 21 April 1948)

Events

8 January – the Council of State meets for the first time when President Sean T. O'Kelly tests the constitutionality of the Offences Against the State Bill.
15 January – gas rationing ends in Dublin for the first time since 1942.
4 February – 1948 Irish general election: Fianna Fáil under Éamon de Valera remain the largest party but lack an overall majority.
15 February – at the Mansion House, Dublin, a plan is drawn up which will see John A. Costello elected Taoiseach.
18 February – members of the 13th Dáil assemble. de Valera is voted out of office as Taoiseach after 16 years and John A. Costello is elected to succeed him as the country's second prime minister and an inter-party government of the 13th Dáil is formed, the first change of government since 1932.
25 February – the Minister for Health, Noel Browne, announces his emergency drive against tuberculosis.
27 February – the Government asks Aerlínte Éireann to postpone its inaugural transatlantic service due to high costs.
7 March – the Minister for External Affairs, Seán MacBride, recommends an economic or customs union between the two parts of Ireland.
11 March – a fire at Shannon Airport destroys the control tower.
16 March – Seán MacBride represents Ireland at the Marshall Aid conference in Paris.
4 April – Captain E. G. Hitzen hands over a flag surrendered during the 1916 Easter Rising. He also discusses his capture of Éamon de Valera.
18 June – a 36-foot shark is spotted off the coast of County Donegal.
22 August – the Dwyer McAllister Cottage at Dernamuck in the Glen of Imaal, Co. Wicklow (scene of rebel leader Michael Dwyer's escape from British troops in 1799), is handed over to the Irish State by the Hoxey family, with President Seán T. O'Kelly, Éamon de Valera and other dignitaries being present at the ceremonial handover.
28 August – the birth of Teresa Ann Browne.
7 September – in Ottawa Taoiseach John A. Costello announces the government intends to repeal the 1936 External Relations Act, thus severing the last constitutional link with Britain.
13 September – 500 people attend a commemoration of the Irish Rebellion of 1798 on the hills overlooking Belfast.
17 September – the body of W. B. Yeats is re-buried at Drumcliffe, County Sligo, "Under bare Ben Bulben's head".
22 September – Taoiseach John A. Costello is presented with an honorary doctorate of law from the Jesuit Fordham University, New York.
17 October – at the request of the British Prime Minister Clement Attlee, the Minister for Finance (Ireland), Seán MacBride, and the Minister for External Affairs, Patrick McGilligan, meet representatives from the United Kingdom, Canada, Australia and New Zealand to discuss the repeal of the External Relations Act.
26 October – final ruling in the Sinn Féin Funds case decides that the Sinn Féin party as reconstituted in 1923 is "not in any legal sense a continuation" of the party that had "melted away" in 1922 and is thus unable to claim funds deposited in its name in the High Court.
17 November – the Republic of Ireland Act 1948, which involves the repeal of the External Relations Act, is introduced in Dáil Éireann.
25 November – the Republic of Ireland Bill is passed in Dáil Éireann.
21 December – President Seán T. O'Kelly signs the Republic of Ireland Bill at a ceremony at Áras an Uachtaráin. Taoiseach John A. Costello and members of his government are also present.
Full date unknown
An Taisce, the National Trust for Ireland, is founded in June, with naturalist Robert Lloyd Praeger as its first President.
The "Blue Hussars", the ceremonial Mounted Escort of the Irish Army, are disbanded.
Irish Farmers Journal launched.

Arts and literature

May – the Music Association of Ireland is set up by a group of composers (including Brian Boydell, Aloys Fleischmann and Frederick May) and music-lovers to promote classical music in Ireland.
Brian Boydell's first major success, In Memoriam Mahatma Gandhi, Op. 30, is premiered by the Radio Éireann Symphony Orchestra under the composer's baton at the Phoenix Hall, Dublin.
Robert Farren publishes his critical work The Course of Irish Verse in English.
Patrick Kavanagh publishes his novel Tarry Flynn.

Sport

Football

League of Ireland
Winners:Drumcondra

FAI Cup
Winners: Shamrock Rovers 2 – 1 Drumcondra.

Golf

Irish Open is won by Dai Rees (Wales).

Births

1 January – Johnny Brady, Fianna Fáil TD for Meath West.
29 January – Pat Kenny, presenter of The Late Late Show.
10 February – John Magnier, businessman and leading thoroughbred stud owner.
16 February
Séamus Brennan, Fianna Fáil TD and government minister.
John Fleming, Roman Catholic Bishop of Killala (2002– ).
18 February – Sinéad Cusack, actress.
2 March – Rory Gallagher, guitarist (died 1995).
10 March – Pat "the Cope" Gallagher, Fianna Fáil TD for Donegal South-West, Minister of State and MEP.
7 April – Maurice FitzGerald, 9th Duke of Leinster, peer.
21 April – Clare Boylan, author, journalist and critic (died 2006).
25 May – Seán FitzPatrick, banker (died 2021).
26 May – Kate Cruise O'Brien, writer (died 1998).
13 June – Darina Allen, chef and television personality.
14 June – John Connolly, Galway hurler.
24 June – Anita Reeves, actress (died 2016).
27 July – Moss Keane, international rugby player.
6 August – Mick Leech, soccer player.
19 August – Christy O'Connor Jnr, golfer (died 2016).
20 August – Michael Halliday, cricketer.
30 August – Donnacha O'Dea, Olympic swimmer (1968), professional poker player.
31 August – Tony Martin, politician in Canada.
14 September – Ned Byrne, Kilkenny hurler.
20 September – Tommy Peoples, fiddler (died 2018).
15 October – Chris de Burgh, singer and songwriter (as Christopher Davison, in Argentina).
23 October – Gerry Robinson, businessman and television presenter.
9 November – Ray Cummins, Cork Gaelic footballer and hurler.
Full date unknown
Dónal Clifford, Cork hurler.
Dermot Healy, hurling manager.
Teddy Holland, Gaelic football manager.
Frank Norberg, Cork hurler.
Jackie Tabick, reform rabbi, first female rabbi in the British Isles.
Willie Walsh, Cork hurler.

Deaths

9 February – John M. O'Sullivan, Cumann na nGaedheal TD and Cabinet Minister (died 1891).
12 February – Armar Lowry-Corry, 5th Earl Belmore, High Sheriff and Deputy Lieutenant of County Fermanagh (born 1870).
21 February – Annie M. P. Smithson, nurse, novelist, poet and Nationalist (born 1873).
23 February – John Robert Gregg, creator of Gregg Shorthand (born 1867).
12 March – George Noble Plunkett, nationalist, politician, museum curator (born 1851).
25 March – Bridget Sullivan, domestic housemaid for Borden family of Fall River, Massachusetts (born 1866).
7 May – James Nathaniel Halbert, entomologist (born 1871).
9 May – Eddie Doyle, Kilkenny hurler (born 1897).
15 May – Edward J. Flanagan, popularly known as Father Flanagan founder of Boys Town in Nebraska (born 1886).
18 June – Conal Holmes O'Connell O'Riordan, dramatist and novelist (born 1874).
13 August – Edwin Maxwell, actor (born 1886).
27 August – Cissie Cahalan, trade unionist, feminist and suffragette (died 1876).
10 September – Bernard Forbes, 8th Earl of Granard, soldier and politician (born 1874).
30 October – Neal Blaney, Fianna Fáil TD, Seanad member (born 1893).
21 November – James O'Mara, Irish Parliamentary Party and Sinn Féin MP (born 1873).
28 November – D. D. Sheehan, journalist, barrister, author, Irish Parliamentary Party MP representing Mid Cork (1901–1918), one of four MP's to serve in 16th (Irish) Division in World War I (born 1873).
30 November – J. J. Walsh, Sinn Féin MP, member of 1st Dáil, a founder-member of Cumann na nGaedheal and Cabinet Minister (born 1880).
9 December – Sir Tim O'Brien, 3rd Baronet, cricketer (born 1861).

References 

 
1940s in Ireland
Ireland
Years of the 20th century in Ireland